Malladi is a village in Palnadu district of the Indian state of Andhra Pradesh. It is located in Amaravathi mandal of Guntur revenue division. The village forms a part of Andhra Pradesh Capital Region, under the jurisdiction of APCRDA.

Geography 

This village and the surrounding areas of Amaravathi have a continuous history of at least 2,300 years.

Demographics 

 Census of India, the village had a population of 2,582. The total population constitute, 1,247 males and 1,335 females —a sex ratio of 1071 females per 1000 males. 289 children are in the age group of 0–6 years, of which 144 are boys and 145 are girls —a ratio of 1007 per 1000. The average literacy rate stands at 59.83% with 1,372 literates, significantly lower than the state average of 67.41%.

Government and politics 

Malladi Gram Panchayat is the local self-government of the village. There are wards, each represented by an elected ward member. The present sarpanch is vacant, elected by the ward members. The village is administered by the  Amaravathi Mandal Parishad at the intermediate level of panchayat raj institutions.

Education 

As per the school information report for the academic year 2018–19, the village has a total of 4 Zilla/Mandal Parishad.

References 

Geography of Andhra Pradesh